Liberian may refer to:
 Something of, from, or related to Liberia, a country on the west coast of Africa
 A person from Liberia, or of Liberian descent, see Demographics of Liberia 
Americo-Liberians
 Liberian culture
 Liberian cuisine
 Liberian English

See also 
 
List of Liberians
Languages of Liberia

Language and nationality disambiguation pages